is a 1970 Japanese anime fantasy adventure film. It was released on 19 July 1970.

Plot
The ruler of the underground world, is planning to conquer the whole world. Riding the fire dragon Isamu and Angel, the princess of the undersea kingdom, try to stop him from destroying their world.

Cast
Masako Nozawa as Isamu
Kurumi Kobato as Angel

References

External links
30,000 Miles Under the Sea at Toei Animation 

1970 anime films
1970s fantasy adventure films
Animated adventure films
Japanese fantasy adventure films
Japanese animated fantasy films
Toei Animation films